Rhodophthitus is a genus of moths in the family Geometridae described by Arthur Gardiner Butler in 1880.

Species
Some species of this genus are:
Rhodophthitus anamesa (Prout, 1915)
Rhodophthitus arichanaria D. S. Fletcher, 1978
Rhodophthitus atacta Prout, 1922
Rhodophthitus atricoloraria (Mabille, 1890)
Rhodophthitus barlowi (Prout, 1922)
Rhodophthitus betsileanus Herbulot, 1965
Rhodophthitus castus Warren, 1904
Rhodophthitus commaculata (Warren, 1897)
Rhodophthitus formosus Butler, 1880
Rhodophthitus myriostictus Prout, 1915
Rhodophthitus procellosa Warren, 1905
Rhodophthitus pseudabraxas Carcasson, 1964
Rhodophthitus roseovittata (Butler, 1895)
Rhodophthitus rudicornis (Butler, 1898)
Rhodophthitus simplex Warren, 1897
Rhodophthitus thapsinus Prout, 1931
Rhodophthitus tricoloraria (Mabille, 1890)
Rhodophthitus unca (Le Cerf, 1922)

References

Geometridae